Star Collection is a German compilation album released in 1973. It includes songs from Iron Butterfly's first and third album: Heavy and Ball.

Track listing
"Get Out of My Life, Woman" (Allen Toussaint) – 3:58 (originally featured in Heavy)
"So-Lo" (Darryl DeLoach, Doug Ingle) – 4:05 (originally featured in Heavy)
"You Can't Win" (DeLoach, Danny Weis) – 2:41 (originally featured in Heavy)
"Her Favorite Style" (Ingle) – 3:14 (originally featured in Ball)
"It Must Be Love" (Ingle) – 4:26 (originally featured in Ball)
"Iron Butterfly Theme" (Ingle) – 4:36 (originally featured in Heavy)
"In the Time of Our Lives" (Ingle, Ron Bushy) – 4:52 (originally featured in Ball)
"Lonely Boy" (Ingle) – 5:00  (originally featured in Ball)
"Belda-Beast" (Erik Brann) – 5:45 (originally featured in Ball)

Band members
Doug Ingle – organ (all tracks), lead vocals (1, 3-5, 7, 8)
Darryl DeLoach – tambourine (1-3, 6), backing (1-3, 6) and lead (2) vocals
Danny Weis – guitar (1-3, 6)
Erik Brann – guitar (4, 5, 7-9), backing (4, 5, 7-9) and lead (9) vocals
Jerry Penrod – bass (1-3, 6)
Lee Dorman – bass (4, 5, 7-9), backing vocals (4, 5, 7-9)
Ron Bushy – drums (all tracks)

Iron Butterfly compilation albums
1973 greatest hits albums
MCA Records compilation albums